The Kawa River (Wae or Wai Kawa) is a river of Seram Island, Maluku province, Indonesia, about 2500 km northeast of the capital Jakarta.

Hydrology
It flows in an easterly direction through the southern area of Manusela National Park, with many "small, fast-flowing rivers running through".

Geography
The river flows in the southern central area of Seram island with predominantly tropical rainforest climate (designated as Af in the Köppen-Geiger climate classification). The annual average temperature in the area is 22 °C. The warmest month is December, when the average temperature is around 24 °C, and the coldest is August, at 20 °C. The average annual rainfall is 3137 mm. The wettest month is July, with an average of 494 mm rainfall, and the driest is October, with 89 mm rainfall.

See also
List of rivers of Indonesia
List of rivers of Maluku (province)

References

Rivers of Seram Island
Rivers of Indonesia